Foshan Lingnan Mingzhu Gymnasium is an indoor sporting arena located in Foshan City, Guangdong Province, China. Opened in 2006, the capacity of the arena is 8,324 spectators.  It hosts indoor sporting events such as basketball and volleyball and is the home of the Foshan Dralions who play in the Chinese Basketball Association league.  The arena also hosted the boxing events at the 2010 Asian Games.

References

Indoor arenas in China
Sports venues in Guangdong
Venues of the 2010 Asian Games